Cartas de amor may refer to:
Cartas de amor (film), Argentine film, see List of Argentine films of 1951
Cartas de amor (telenovela), Mexican telenovela